Umba may refer to
Umba, Russia, an urban-type settlement in Murmansk Oblast, Russia
Umba (White Sea), a river on the Kola Peninsula, Russia
Umba River (Tanzania), a river in Tanzania
Umba sapphire, a sapphire from Tanzania
Umba Valley, a valley in Tanzania
Umba, Papua New Guinea, a town and airport in Papua New Guinea